Grace Field (born 28 March 1994) is an Australian football (soccer) player, who currently captains and plays for Canberra United in the Australian W-League.

In 2020, following a brief departure from soccer, Field returned to play for Canberra Croatia.

References

1994 births
Living people
Australian women's soccer players
Canberra United FC players
Sportspeople from Canberra
Soccer players from the Australian Capital Territory
Women's association football defenders
20th-century Australian women
21st-century Australian women